Korfovo is a rural locality (a selo) in Krasnensky Selsoviet of Tambovsky District, Amur Oblast, Russia. The population was 72 as of 2018. There are 3 streets.

Geography 
Korfovo is located on the Amur River, 59 km southwest of Tambovka (the district's administrative centre) by road. Krasnoye is the nearest rural locality.

References 

Rural localities in Tambovsky District, Amur Oblast